William Tate may refer to:

William Tate (MP) (1559–1617), English politician
William Tate (painter) (1747–1806), English portrait painter
William Tate (soldier), Irish-American colonel in the French Revolutionary Wars
William Tate (baseball), American baseball player
William Tate (academic) (1903–1980), Dean at the University of Georgia
William Tate (lighthouse keeper), lighthouse keeper and aviation pioneer
William Tate (priest) (died 1540), Canon of Windsor
William Tate (bowls), Irish lawn bowler
Bill Tate (American football) (born c. 1932), college football head coach
Bill Tate (boxer) (1911–1953), African American boxer
William Tate, Jr., a character in the TV series Believe

See also
William Tait (disambiguation)